Verlin is a surname. Notable people with the surname include:

Don Verlin (born 1965), American basketball coach
Ronald Verlin Cassill (1919–2002), American writer, editor, painter and lithographer
Sarana VerLin (born 1953), American singer-songwriter and musician
Sergey Verlin (born 1974), Russian sprint canoer